Franco Ciampitti (1903–1988) was an Italian writer. His work was part of the literature event in the art competition at the 1936 Summer Olympics.

References

1903 births
1988 deaths
20th-century Italian male writers
Olympic competitors in art competitions
People from Isernia